2018 Tipsport liga is the twenty-first edition of the annual football tournament in Czech Republic.

Groups

Group A
 All matches will be played in Vyšehrad.

Group B
 All matches will be played in Xaverov.

Group C
 All matches will be played in Brno.

Group D
 All matches will be played in Frýdek-Místek.

Semifinals

Third place

Final

References

2018 in association football
Tipsport